Theobald Bourke, 8th Mac William Iochtar (died 1503) was an Irish chieftain and noble who succeeded his cousin (who retired in 1473) as lord of Lower (North) Connacht, Ireland.

Theobald was the son of Walter mac Thomas de Búrca (Walter Bourke), 3rd Mac William Iochtar (d.1440). In 1473, he succeeded his cousin, Ricard Ó Cuairsge Bourke, 7th Mac William Íochtar (d. 1479) as chieftain. Theobald was succeeded by his brother, Ricard Bourke, 9th Mac William Íochtar (d.1509).

Annalistic references

 M1480.14. A spirited engagement took place between the sons of Edmond Burke and the sons of Richard Burke, in which the sons of Edmond were routed; and the son of Mac Dowell Mac Dugald of Scotland, i.e. Colla, was slain by one cast of a dart, and many others were slain along with him.
 M1486.15. An army was mustered by O'Donnell, and marched into Tirawley. The Lower Mac William went to oppose him; and a battle was fought between them, in which upwards of one hundred of Mac William's people were slain, and John Mac Jordan, Ulick, the son of Richard, son of Thomas Burke, with many others, were taken prisoners.
 M1487.26. Edmond, the son of Richard Burke, was treacherously taken prisoner by the Barretts, but was afterwards triumphantly rescued by his kinsmen.
 M1488.28. A peace was concluded between O'Donnell and Mac William Burke, O'Conor and Mac Dermot being as sureties and guarantees between them.

Genealogy

 Sir Edmond Albanach de Burgh (d. 1375),  1st Mac William Íochtar (Lower Mac William), (Mayo)
 William de Burgh (d.1368)
 Thomas mac Edmond Albanach de Burca, 1375–1402, 2nd Mac William Íochtar
 Walter mac Thomas de Burca (d.1440), 3rd Mac William Íochtar
 Theobald Bourke (d.1503), 8th Mac William Íochtar
 Meiler Bourke (d.1520), 11th Mac William Íochtar
 Ricard Bourke (d.1509), 9th Mac William Íochtar
 Seaán an Tearmainn Bourke (alive 1527), 13th Mac William Íochtar
 Ricard mac Seaán an Tearmainn Bourke (d.1571), 16th Mac William Íochtar
 Edmund na Féasóige de Burca, (d.1458), 4th Mac William Íochtar
 Ricard Ó Cuairsge Bourke (d.1473), 7th Mac William Íochtar
 Edmond de Burca (d.1527), 10th Mac William Íochtar
 Walter de Burca
 Seaán de Burca
 Oliver de Burca
 Seaán mac Oliver Bourke (d.1580), 17th Mac William Íochtar
 Richard Bourke (d.1586), 19th Mac William Íochtar
 Walter Ciotach de Burca of Belleek (d.1590)
 Tibbot (Theobald) MacWalter Kittagh Bourke, 21st Mac William Íochtar, 1st Marquess of Mayo
 Walter (Balthasar) Bourke, 2nd Marquess of Mayo
 Thomas Ruadh de Burca
 Uilleag de Burca
 Edmond de Burca (d.1527), 12th Mac William Íochtar
 David de Burca (alive 1537), 15th Mac William Íochtar
 Richard the Iron Bourke (d.1583), 18th Mac William Íochtar
 Tibbot (Theobald) ne Long Bourke (1567-1629), 23rd Mac William Íochtar, 1st Viscount Mayo (1627)
 Viscounts Mayo
 William "the Blind Abbot" Bourke (d.1593), 20th Mac William Íochtar
 Theobald mac Uilleag Bourke (d.1537), 14th Mac William Íochtar
 Risdeárd de Burca
 Ricard Deamhan an Chorráin de Burca
 Risdeárd Mac Deamhan an Chorráin (Richard) "the Devils Hook" Bourke (d.1601), 22nd Mac William Íochtar
 Seaán de Burca (d.1456)
 Tomás Óg de Burca, (d.1460), 5th Mac William Íochtar
 Risdeárd de Burca (d.1473), 6th Mac William Íochtar

References

Further reading
 The History of Mayo, Hubert T. Knox, 1908
 Lower Mac William and Viscounts of Mayo, 1332-1649, in A New History of Ireland IX, pp. 235–36, Oxford, 1984 (reprinted 2002).

External links
 * http://www.ucc.ie/celt/published/T100005D/

People from County Mayo
15th-century Irish people
16th-century Irish people
1503 deaths
Theobald
Year of birth unknown